Soldini is a surname which was first used in Florence when it was the capital of the Kingdom of Italy. 

People with the surname are as follows:

Antonio Soldini (1854–1933), Swiss-Italian sculptor
Felice Soldini (1915–1971), Swiss football player
Jean Soldini (born 1956), Swiss philosopher
Pier Angelo Soldini (1910–1974), Italian novelist and journalist
Silvio Soldini (born 1958), Italian film director

References

Surnames of Italian origin